Watch Out is the fifth album by the Spanish group Barrabás, released in 1975. The album was later re-released on CD in Spain as Desperately.

The girl posing on the cover of the album is Ellen Michaels.

"Desperately" / "Broadway Star" was released as a single, although "It" was the B-side in some countries.

Barrabás' next album, Barrabás, was re-released on CD under the title Watch-Out, but is unrelated to this album.

Track listing
"Broadway Star" (Fernando Arbex) – 3:59
"It" (Arbex) – 3:57
"Fire Girl" (Enrique Morales) – 5:05
"Desperately" (Arbex) – 5:20
"High Light" (Ernesto Duarte, E. Morales, Miguel Morales) – 4:20
"Sexy Lady" (M. Morales) – 4:40
"Better Days" (Duarte, José Luís Tejada) – 4:25
"Lay It Down on Me" (M. Morales) – 4:25

"It" was renamed "Take It All" on the Desperately CD version of the album.
"Lay It Down on Me" is sometime erroneously shown as "Lay Down on Me".

Personnel
José Luís Tejada – lead vocals, percussion
Enrique "Ricky" Morales – lead guitar, vocals on tracks 6 & 8
Miguel Morales – guitar, bass guitar, vocals
Ernesto "Tito" Duarte – saxophone, flute, percussion, bass guitar, keyboards
Juan Vidal – keyboards, vocals
Daniel Louis – drums, percussion
Produced by Fernando Arbex
Recorded at Atlantic Studios, New York
Sound engineer – Jim Douglas
Sleeve design – Toni Gayán

Release information
Spain – Ariola Eurodisc
Germany – Ariola 27 682 XOT
USA & Canada – Atco SD 36-136 (1976)
Disconforme DISC 1990CD (2001 CD) as Desperately

References

 Entry at Allmusic []
 Album cover / sleeve notes

1975 albums
Barrabás albums